Diego de Arroyo (1498–1551), a Spanish miniature painter born at Toledo, is supposed to have studied either in Italy or under an Italian master. His delicate miniature portraits gained him much renown, and the appointment of painter to Charles V. He also illuminated choir-books for the cathedral of Toledo. Arroyo died at Madrid in 1551.

References
 

1498 births
1551 deaths
People from Toledo, Spain
Portrait miniaturists
16th-century Spanish painters
Spanish male painters